Menos may refer to:

People 
 Gus Menos (1920–1990), American politician
 Hilary Menos (born 1964), English poet
 Solon Ménos (1859–1918), Haitian author and politician

Fictional characters
 Menos, a character in ''Teen Titans Go " ; see Más y Menos
 Menos, creatures in the Bleach universe

Other uses 
 Multimedia Exchange Network over Satellite

See also

 
 Menon (disambiguation)
 Meno (disambiguation)